Roger Erell (9 April 1907 – 1 January 1986) (the pseudonym Erell -RL- comes from the initials of his real name), was a French architect and resistance fighter.

Early life 
Erell was born Roger Lelièvre in Mansle (Charente) in 1907.

Works in Brazzaville 
He is known principally for the Basilica of Sainte-Anne-du-Congo in  Brazzaville

His other works include:
 Case de Gaulle (1942).. (originally a guesthouse for distinguished visitors, now Residence of the French ambassador to Brazzaville)  :fr:Case de Gaulle
 Maison commune de Poto-Poto (1942-1943)
 Palais de l'Artisanat (1943) (destroyed in 1985, except for the facade.  with a fresco of Africa)  
 Stade Félix Éboué (1944) next to the basilique sainte Anne  
 Phare de Brazza (1944, 1952)
 Pavillon principal de la Cité Pasteur (1948)
 Basilique Sainte-Anne du Congo (1949)
 Lycée Savorgnan de Brazza (1949-1952)
 Arcades de l'Avenue Foch (with :fr:Jean-Yves Normand) (1949-1954)
 Trésor public (formerly :fr: Banque internationale pour l'Afrique occidentale (1950)
 Building Paternelle (avec Jean-Yves Normand) (1953)
 Ex-Banque belge d'Afrique (now Société Générale) (1954)
 Maison d'arrêt
 Clinique Grosperrin, now included in the'État-Major.
 former-Hôtel Impérial  
 DST (formerly, Caisse centrale de l'AEF)
 Faculté de droit of Marien Ngouabi University  - formerly -CEG Bouboutou (formerly Centre d'études supérieures)

Death 
Erell died in Vallauris (Alpes-Maritimes) in 1986.

References 

1907 births
1986 deaths
20th-century French architects
People from Charente
Architecture in the Republic of the Congo
People from Brazzaville